Eric Shaw (born 1973) is an American television writer whose credits include Nickelodeon's SpongeBob SquarePants. Originally from Jericho, NY, he attended Jericho High School and graduated from Columbia University.  He has been an animation writer since 2003 and has also written for Skunk Fu, Krypto the Superdog, Sid the Science Kid, My Friends Tigger & Pooh and many other animated hit shows.  He is known for writing on SpongeBob SquarePants seasons five and six.   As a staff writer, Shaw had written 10 SpongeBob episodes. In 2007, Shaw served as the President of the International Jury at the Cartoons on the Bay Animation Festival in Salerno, Italy. Shaw was Head Writer on the PBS animated series WordGirl starring Tom Kenny, Maria Bamford, Patton Oswalt, Jeffrey Tambor, and others. Shaw ran the writing on Season 5 (26 episodes), from Soup2Nuts's Watertown, Mass studio. On June 14, 2013, he won an Emmy Award for Outstanding Writing in Animation at the 40th Annual Creative Arts Daytime Emmy Awards.

SpongeBob episodes

References

External links

Living people
American television writers
American male television writers
1973 births
People from Jericho, New York
Columbia University alumni
Screenwriters from New York (state)